Gaetano Cristiano Vincenzo Rossi (born 8 September 1949), best known as Christian, is an Italian singer, mainly successful in the first half of the 1980s.

Background 
Born in Palermo, the son of a policeman and a housewife, at young age Rossi was a football player for Palermo and Mantova F.C., but had to quit for a cardiac arrhythmia. He started his career as a singer in the early 1970s, and got his first hit in 1980, with the song "Daniela" which ranked at the seventh place on the Italian hit parade. Often paired with Julio Iglesias, with whom he shared some authors and a similar style, between 1982 and 1984 Christian had four singles peaking at first place on the Italian hit parade. Between 1982 and 1990 he also entered the main competition at the Sanremo Music Festival six times, ranking third in 1984 with the song "Cara". 

Rossi married the singer Dora Moroni in 1987; the couple divorced in 1997.  They had a son, Alfredo.

Discography
Album

     1977 - Piccola incosciente
     1982 - Un'altra vita un altro amore
     1983 - Christian
     1984 - Cara
     1985 - Sere
     1986 - Insieme
     1987 - Quando l'amore...
     1988 - Guardando il cielo
     1990 - Se non è amore...deve essere amore
     1990 - Canzoni di Natale
     1991 - L'amore è una cosa meravigliosa
     1992 - Un cielo in più ed altri successi
     1993 - Christian 1993
     1995 - Parlami
     1996 - Angeli senza paradiso
     2000 - Cuore in viaggio
     2004 - Finalmente l'alba
     2007 - Per amore
     2011 - Cara mamma
     2015 - Christian The Best of

Singles 
1967: Ti voglio tanto bene - Hai ragione tu
1967: L'amore di una sola estate - Tutto finirà
1968: Ora sei con me - C'è tanto mare
1968: Tutte meno te - Una così così
1969: Oro e argento - Tra di noi
1970: Amore vero amore amaro - Sayonara
1971: Firmamento - Amo
1972: Come mai - Dai vieni con noi
1974: Giochi d'amore - Sole nero
1975: Sto con lei - Dormici sopra (Spark, SR 828)
1976: Dolce donna - Non so dir ti voglio bene
1976: Piccola Incosciente - Ma ci pensi tu
1977: Che sventola - Non dimenticar (Spark, SR 853)
1978: Parlami di lei - Colpo d'amore
1979: Santa Caterina - Vangelo
1980: Adesso amiamoci - Scusa
1980: Daniela - Non voglio perderti
1982: Un'altra vita un altro amore - Com'eri bella tu
1983: Abbracciami amore mio - Volare via
1983: Nostalgia - Solo tu
1984: Cara - Un giorno in più
1984: Se te ne vai - Solo tu
1985: Notte serena - Fra poco il sole è là
1985: Insieme - Calypso melody
1987: Aria e musica - Noi non cambieremo mai
1987: Quando l'amore se ne va
1988: Rimini - Rimini (versione strumentale)
1989: Bikini - E vola via l'età
1990: Amore - Una speranza
2016: Siamo solo uomini

References

External links
 
 

1949 births
Musicians from Palermo
Italian pop singers
Italian male singers
Living people